Francis Connor (1857 – 24 August 1916) was an Australian businessman, pastoralist, and politician who served in both houses of the Parliament of Western Australia, as a member of the Legislative Assembly from 1893 to 1905 and as a member of the Legislative Council from 1906 until his death.

Early life
Connor was born in Newry, County Armagh, Ireland. He arrived in Sydney, Australia, in 1885, and from there went to Wyndham, a small town in Western Australia's Kimberley region. In Wyndham, Connor went into partnership with a schoolmate from Ireland, Denis Doherty, who eventually also entered parliament. Their firm initially supplied goods to the Kimberley goldfields. They later went into the live cattle trade, acquiring two pastoral leases in the Northern Territory (Newry Station and Auvergne Station). In 1897, Connor and Doherty merged their business with that of Michael Durack, forming Connor, Doherty & Durack.

Politics
In 1893, Connor was elected to parliament at a by-election for the seat of East Kimberley, caused by the death of the sitting member, William Baker. He held East Kimberley until it was abolished at the 1904 state election, and thereafter transferred to the seat of Kimberley. Later in 1904, Connor was one of four independents to announce their support for the Labor Party, allowing Henry Daglish to form a minority government (and become the first Premier of Western Australia from the Labor Party). The Labor government fell after just over a year, and Connor was defeated in his seat at the 1905 state election by Arthur Male. He re-entered parliament in June 1906, winning election to the Legislative Council's North Province, and was re-elected to a second six-year term in 1912.

Death
Connor died in office in August 1916 (aged 59). The circumstances of his death were highly unusual, and prompted a coronial inquest. While at his property in Benger, Connor organised to go on a kangaroo hunt with his wife and a friend (a Catholic priest). While loading a gun in his office, the weapon went off, shattering Connor's skull and killing him instantaneously. It was thought that his wife (the only witness) had startled him by opening the office door, and the death was found to be purely accidental. His wife was the sole beneficiary of his will.

See also
 Independent politicians in Australia

References

1857 births
1916 deaths
Accidental deaths in Western Australia
Australian pastoralists
Deaths by firearm in Western Australia
Independent members of the Parliament of Western Australia
Irish emigrants to colonial Australia
Members of the Western Australian Legislative Assembly
Members of the Western Australian Legislative Council
People from Newry
19th-century Australian businesspeople
Hunting accident deaths
Firearm accident victims